Robert Nilsson (born 7 April 1949) is a Norwegian footballer. He played in five matches for the Norway national football team from 1970 to 1971.

References

External links
 

1949 births
Living people
Norwegian footballers
Norway international footballers
Place of birth missing (living people)
Association footballers not categorized by position